Fred Olen Ray (born September 10, 1954) is an American film producer, director, and screenwriter of more than 200 low-to-medium-budget feature films in many genres, including horror, science fiction, action/adventure, erotic thrillers, crime dramas, and holiday films.

Ray is the head of Retromedia, which releases DVDs of both his own productions and archival films. He has also worked for other well-known independent studios and on a few occasions for major Hollywood studios. He has been cited as an inspiration for many independent filmmakers. He loaned a 16 mm camera to Quentin Tarantino so he could make My Best Friend's Birthday.

Aside from his work in the film industry, Ray was also a professional wrestler. His wrestling name was Fabulous Freddie Valentine.

Early life
Ray was born September 10, 1954 in Wellston, Ohio to a family originally from West Virginia. As a teenager, he regularly read Famous Monsters of Filmland magazine. Being a fan of horror and science fiction films such as Abbott and Costello Meet Frankenstein and the AIP movies of the 1950s and 1960s, Ray started making his own movies at the age of fourteen. At age 17, he self-published three issues of the amateur fantasy-film fanzine Dagon in 1972.

Career

Early work and The Brain Leeches (1970s) 
Ray served in the United States Navy. After his discharge, he began working at a local television station, in Orlando, Florida. He first appeared in a small role in the 1975 film Shock Waves, which starred Peter Cushing and John Carradine. Ray then began directing independent films during free time using station equipment, starting with The Brain Leeches (1978) produced on a budget of $298.00. Ray also co-wrote the screenplay with political essayist Brad Linaweaver, and the two later collaborated on additional films.

1980s 
Ray's next film was shot on a budget of $15,000. Lessons learned from The Brain Leeches allowed Ray to keep production cost to a minimum, while using the bulk of the budget to attract a recognized Hollywood name to the project. Alien Dead was shot featuring an elderly Buster Crabbe, cinema action hero of the 1930s and 1940, and star of three Flash Gordon serials from 1936-1940. With the success of that film, Ray decided to move to Hollywood to be close to the film industry. He was interested in working in make-up and special effects, "probably from all of those years of reading Famous Monsters magazine", he later said. He found out "it soon became apparent that you would always be between jobs and I was looking for something that would actually earn me a living. I think I became a director because that was the fastest way to get a film made on the independent side of things."

Ray succeeded in raising money for a low budget horror film, Scalps (1983), which featured cameos from Carroll Borland and Forrest J. Ackerman. The Tomb (1986) starred Cameron Mitchell and John Carradine. Ray switched to action films with Armed Response (1986), which starred David Carradine and Lee Van Cleef. Ray had affection for this movie because "it had a great cast and was one of the first times I had more than two nickels to rub together." He then turned to science fiction: Deep Space (1987), Cyclone (1987). Beverly Hills Vamp (1988) was a horror comedy with Eddie Deezen. Hollywood Chainsaw Hookers (1988) was made in only a few days and turned out to be a big hit. Less popular was The Phantom Empire (1988).

1990s 

After Alienator (1989) he was reunited with Deezen for Mob Boss (1990), another comedy. He entered sword and sorcery movies with Wizards of the Demon Sword (1991) and made the more popular Bad Girls from Mars (1991). During this time he published a book he had written, The New Poverty Row: Independent Filmmakers as Distributors (1991).

Ray co-directed Scream Queen Hot Tub Party (1991) with Jim Wynorski, shot in one day. Ray moved into erotic thrillers with Inner Sanctum (1991) starring Tanya Roberts. It was a hit and Ray would make others in that genre, including Inner Sanctum 2, Mind Twister (1994) and Possessed by the Night (1994).

Evil Toons (1992) was a comedy-horror, then he co-directed another with Wynorski, Dinosaur Island (1994). Witch Academy (1994) was the last of his "scream queen" movies. After Attack of the 60 Foot Centerfold (1995), he made Fugitive Rage (1996), Friend of the Family II (1996), Inferno (1997), Hybrid (1997), and The Shooter, which has been referred to as Ray's best film. Dear Santa (1998) was a family film and Billy Frankenstein (1998) a comedy.

2000s to present 
In 2001 he made the film Critical Mass. He later said he was a "Critical Mass kind of guy. I like to shoot things and blow stuff up. I also like comedies. Don't like erotic thrillers."

He established a DVD company called Retromedia. Ray made a film called Bikini Airways "on a lark and it did really well", said Ray. This led to a series of Bikini films.

In 2007 he reflected on his career:

Budgetary constraints notwithstanding, Ray has on occasion been able to attract A list actors to appear in his films. Two time Academy Award nominee Peter Fonda played Marshal Kane in the 2010 Ray film American Bandits: Frank and Jesse James. One reviewer described American Bandits as perhaps "the most boring Jesse James film ever made".
 
In 2017, he received a "Living Legend Award" at the Buffalo Dreams Fantastic Film Festival.

In 2019 he produced and released Boggy Creek: The Series with director Henrique Couto at the helm.

Books
 Grind Show - Weirdness as Entertainment (1993)
 The New Poverty Row: Independent Filmmakers as Distributors (2011),

Filmography

Film

Television

TV Movies

TV Series

See also
Sam Newfield, a filmmaker who uses the "Sherman Scott" and "Peter Stewart" pseudonyms.
Brad Linaweaver, science fiction writer, publisher, and frequent Ray collaborator.

References

External links

1954 births
Living people
American television writers
American male television writers
American television directors
Horror film directors
American male professional wrestlers
People from Wellston, Ohio
Film directors from Ohio
Screenwriters from Ohio